The 2004 Big 12 Conference baseball tournament was held at Ameriquest Field in Arlington in Arlington, Texas, from May 26 through 30.  The Cowboys of Oklahoma State University won their first tournament and earned the Big 12 Conference's automatic bid to the 2004 NCAA Division I baseball tournament. The tournament mirrored the format of the College World Series, with two 4-team double-elimination brackets and a final championship game.

Regular Season Standings
Source:

Colorado and Iowa State did not sponsor baseball teams.

Tournament

 13 innings.
Kansas and Kansas State did not make the tournament.

All-Tournament Team

See also
College World Series
NCAA Division I Baseball Championship
Big 12 Conference baseball tournament

References

Big 12 Tourney media guide 
Boydsworld 2004 Standings

Tournament
Big 12 Conference Baseball Tournament
Big 12 Conference baseball tournament
Big 12 Conference baseball tournament
21st century in Arlington, Texas
College sports tournaments in Texas
Baseball competitions in Arlington, Texas